Sambalpur, in Orissa, India, is a region that has a distinct cultural identity. The songs, clothing, dances, language and festivals celebrated in Sambalpur are unique. This distinct cultural identity arises from the strong association of the tribal and folk communities which have been coexisting in Sambalpur for centuries.

Fair
Sambalpur Lok Mahotsav

The grand festival of "Lok Mahotsav" is a Folk and Tribal Arts and Culture Festival which aims at showcasing the socio-cultural aspects of the region of Sambalpur, and the strong association between the tribal and folk (mainstream) communities that coexist in the region. This festival is a reflection of the socio-anthropological evolution of the people of this area. Here "Lok" means people, and "Mahotsav" means festival.

Sitalsasthi Carnival

The Sitalasasthi Carnival is an annual festival which celebrates and commemorates the religious reunion of Shiva and Shakti, as Goddess Parvati. The carnival is organised in a grand way in Sambalpur.

Festivals

Nuakhai

This is the most important social festival of Sambalpur. It is a paddy harvest festival. Generally it takes place during the months of August and September. Preparations for the festival start at least 15 days before the festival commences. The first grains of the paddy crop are cooked into various dishes and offered to the deities. Then the eldest member of the family then distributes the above sacred offerings to the younger members of the family. All houses are cleaned properly. People in the community meet and greet each other. Young people seek the blessings of the elders for happy and peaceful lives. It is a community festival celebrated by both rich and poor Hindu families alike.

Pushpuni

Puspuni is an annual festival observed by the people of Western and Southern Odisha. This is observed on the Puni (English Full Moon) day of the month of Pus (Sanskrit Pausha). It derives its origin from the age-old agrarian culture of the land. Basically, it is an annual occasion wherein the farmer families celebrate their annual harvest of paddy. It has given rise to a great tradition of celebration by other communities, too. People of Western Odisha, irrespective of their economic occupation feast, song and dance, and rejoice in giving away on this day.

Makar-Sankranti

Makar Sankranti is celebrated on 14 January every year, though the date might shift by day in some years. In Western Orissa, it is celebrated a little bit differently. People perform various puja and rituals in temples and across rivers and present the Gods with offerings("Prasad") like "Rasi laddoo" which is made of Rasi (sesame seeds) and jaggery. People here believe that impressing the Gods and Goddesses will wash away all sins ("paap") that they might have committed knowingly or unknowingly. Also, Makar Sankranti symbolizes the beautiful bond between friends. On this auspicious day best friends perform a sort of ritual("puja") in the presence of Gods and Goddesses and seek their blessings. Once the ritual is done they are supposed to address their friend as "Makra" which means beloved friend/best friend. There is a belief here, that if you recognize your friendship on this day, it will last forever till death takes you apart.

Sitalsasthi

It is one of the most celebrated mass festival in western Odisha, especially Sambalpur. The festival is a celebration of the divine marriage of Lord Shiva and Goddess Parvati. It goes on for days just like a real Hindu marriage. Two local families carry our the responsibilities of the Bride and Groom families. The old areas of Sambalpur like Jharuapada, Nandpada, and Kansaripada attract significant number of visitors due to their age old Sitalsasthi celebrations. 

Bhai-juntia

It is mostly known only in the region of Western Orissa. Bhai-juntia festival is celebrated on the Mahastami Day of Durga Puja. It is a ritual fasting undertaken by women for the whole day and night to seek Goddess Durga's blessing for the long life of their brothers.

Pua-juntia

This is also a ritual fasting puja of similar austerity for women of the area. The Pua-juntia festival is observed by mothers to invoke the grace of Lord Dutibahana for the long life and prosperity of their sons.

Rath Yatra

Rath Yatra or Jatra is the celebrated on the second (dwitiya) day of shukla pakshya (waxing cycle of moon) of Āshādha Māsa (3rd month of Odia calendar).There is a strong influence of Jagarnath culture in western odisha  & Kirtan organised in most of the villages .

Besides the above listed festivals, other religious festivals are observed. These include Dola Jatra, Durga Puja, Janmastami, Dipavali, Ganesh Puja,  and Saraswati Puja.

Shiva Ratri mela at Huma attracts a large numbers of devotees. Ratha Yatra is held at almost all central places of Sambalpur. On the occasion of Makara Jatra, a fair is held at Themra in Sambalpur.

The most popular festivals celebrated by Muslims are Id-Ul-Fitre, Id-Ul-Juha and Muharram. The Sikhs also celebrate the birth day of Guru Nanak.

Music
The acoustic instruments used in folk music of western Odisha enjoy a special status for its rarity. Moreover, these instruments are the real stuff to create an indomitable presence of the sweet folk styles. ‘Dulduli’ music, a music orchestra of western Orissa's folk music combines Dhol, Nisan, Tasha, Jhanj and Muhuri. In this musical extravaganza, Dhol is the lead rhythm instrument, Nisan is the bass booster, Taasha is the treble booster, Jhanj is the percussion and Muhuri (Sehnai like) is the only and leading ‘sur’ instrument.

It is seen that though the instrumentalists do not have knowledge of the theory, what they play are based on the recommended grammar of folk music of the area without any flaw. Besides, the rich folk have other instruments like Mandal, dhulak, pakhauj, dugi-tabla, mridanga, mardal, dhap, timkidi, Jodi-nagara, Ghanta, behela, khanjani, dhapli, bansi, Singh-Kahali, Bir-Kahali, ghulghula, ghunguru, kendraa, khadkhadi, ektara, ghumra, gini (cymbals), daskathia etc.

The folk instruments which are in vogue in Sambalpur region are Dhole, Madal, Nishan, Tasa, Pakhoj, Bansi, Bir-Kahali, Gini, Ektara, Muhuri, Ghulgula, Ghunguru, Jhanj etc.. They are widely used in temples during 'aarti'.

Dhol: It is an age old instrument of Indian folk music. The 'dhol' of Sambalpur is slightly different in its making and use. It is made from the trunk of a tree. Both the side of the 'dhole' are of same size. Sambalpur 'dhole' can be used for any type of Sambalpuri folk song.

Dandua Dhol: “Dand” or “Danda Nacha” is a popular ancient Odia past time entertainment package based on the various stories between Sri Krishna and Radha. During the old times when plays and dramas were the only sources of entertainment, such acts like “Dand” , “Pala” were very popular among the masses. “Dandua Dhol” is a unique “Dhol” specially used in “Dand” plays.

Mandal: The Sambalpuri 'mandal' is different from that of all other parts of India. The 'mandal' is made out of fired clay and is like a cylinder. Mandal is a drum which is used in slower rhythms. Most of the dance less songs are accomplished with the Mandal. This is a very sweet musical instrument and requires good skills to play. It is found in almost all households of ancient Odias. It is one of the main musical instrument for Kirtan during Ram Navami. Besides it is used during “Jhumer” and “Karma” style songs. It is an essential part of “Karmasani” puja.

Nishan: It is made out of iron sheets. The sound emitted by the 'nishan' is heart throbbing. This is mostly used in worship of Kali or Durga and in the battle field.

Tasha:It is played by two thin bamboo sticks. The sound of 'tasha' creates an atmosphere of horror, fear and excitement.

Muhuri: This musical instrument is made out of wood, with a double reed at one end and a wooden flared bell at the other end. Its sound is thought to create and maintain a sense of auspiciousness and sanctity and, as a result, is widely used during marriages, processions and in temples. Muhuri is the only and leading ‘sur’ instrument in Sambalpuri music.

Dhap: Dhap is percussion sort of a single faced and shallow rimmed drums.It’s a tambourine with wooden frame played using the flat of the palm and fingers.

Murdung : It is a terracotta two-sided drum used in Western Odisha for accompaniment with devotional music (Bhakti like Astaprahari, Kirtan, Pala etc.).The drum is played with palms and fingers of both hands.

Ghumra: Ghumra is considered to be a warrior instrument which was being played in old times before a king was to proceed for a war or after he won a war. “Ghumra Dance” is based on completely on this musical instruments and a very popular form of dance in Kalahandi. The dancers used to hang this instrument at their chest and play it with both hands while dancing and it creates a unique scene.

Kendera: The Kendera is a wooden string instrument, which has one string and is most commonly played by drawing a bow across its string.They are mostly played traditionally by jogis (saints). The folk song played in a kendara is known as kendara gita.

Ghupkudu: This is a traditional folk instrument.It is made up of Mango wood ,the round part is covered with reptile skin and the thread is called ‘thaat’ . The heart touching sound is known as 'Ghubkudu Chang Ghubkudu'. "Ghupkudu nach" is a popular song dance and nowadays it is called as "Kismi Nach".

Khanjni: This musical instrument is mostly used by followers of “Alekh” sect during their Bhajan and Kirtan. Alekh sect is similar to Jains having many similarities between them. The 'matha' or religious place of Alekh sect is called “Mahima Gadi” where this instrument is worshipped.

Baensi: “Baensi” is spoken this way in the western Odisha and means “Bansi” or flute. This instrument takes its inspiration from the eternal love between Lord Sri Krishna and Radha. Sri Krishna used to play this instrument often while gazing cows and that would attract Radha towards him.

Jhanj: It synchronizes the beats and rhythm in Sambalpuri Music and is considered an important background music for 'Kirtans' especially those performed during 'Rath Yatra' (Chariot Festival).

Mitu Kathia: 'Mitu Kathia' as its name suggests is a musical instruments made out of Bamboo wood (Kathia) and is inspired by Parrot (Mitu). It somewhat makes sound like a parrot. Also it is popularly known as “Khidki Khicha” due to its unique style of playing. This instrument is used in “Udanda Kirtan” a particular form of Kirtan held during Ram Navami or during the evening hours in villages.

Ramtali: “Ramtali” is mainly used during “Krushnaguru” plays in Odia villages. Krushnaguru is a unique song and play based performance by a group of people on various mythological topics especially revolving around Krishna in Dvapara Yuga. Ramtali is the main instrument of saint “Narada”, who is considered one of the greatest devotees of Lord Vishnu. A typical hymn he used to sing is “Narayana..Narayana” while playing this instrument in one hand, when he used to enter a place or emanate at a discussion.

Dance

Most of the community dances are connected with a function or the worship of a deity. Colourful folk dances are enjoyed by the people.

Dalkhai Dance

Dalkhai  is a ritual folk dance. Songs sung on this occasion are known as Dalkhai songs. Young girls from Binjhal, Soura and Mirdha tribes perform this dance during Dusshera, Bhaijuntia and other festive occasions. However, non-tribal people of the mainstream society also participate in these ritual dances and songs without hesitation which is an indicator of the tribal and non tribal interaction. The young girls stand in a line or in a semicircular pattern while dancing (Pasayat, 1998, 2003, 2007, 2008, 2009).

Karma Dance

Karma is the most colourful dance of the district. It is mainly a tribal dance in honour of "Karam Sani", the deity who grants children, as they believe. Non-tribal people also participate in this ritual dance and songs. In the beginning the dancers enter the dancing arena in two rows. The drumers and the singers accompany with rhythmic steps.

Humo and Bauli

These are two playful dances performed generally by young and unmarried girls on special occasions who sing and dance in groups. The stepping and movements of the dance are very slow. However, the old and aged women of the villages also play the guiding role during performance of this songs (Pasayat, 2008).

Koisabadi Dance

This dance is prevalent among the Gond and the Bhuyan tribes. Male dancers take part, holding a two-three feet long stick. The songs are mainly based on the immortal love story of Radha and Krishna.

Eminent personalities

A list of people who have contributed in the growth of Sambalpuri culture and Odia language are given below.
 Veer Surendra Sai

Born on 23 January 1809 in Badgaon village under Dhama P.S. in a Royal Family. He ascended the throne of Sambalpur in the year 1827. Popularly known as a warrior, Surendra Sai led a revolution against the British Rulers, assembling thousands of protesters. He was incarcerated by the then British Rulers and breathed his last on 28 February 1884. Called as Sivaji of Odisha, Surendra Sai has been remembered for his unflinching patriotism, dedication for the motherland. He is regarded as the foremost fighter of Freedom movement of the Country

 Gangadhar Meher

Born on 9 August 1862 on the day of Sravana Purnima at Barpali, Bargarh District (undivided Sambalpur Dist.) in a weaver family. Educated up to 5th Class.  His poetic creation includes ‘Pranaya Ballari’, ‘Kichaka Badha’, ‘Indumati’ , ‘Utkal Laxmi’, ‘Ayodhya’, ‘Bharati Bhabana’, ‘Bhakti Upahar’,  Kabita Mala’ & ‘Krushaka Sangita’ Gangadhar is widely known as poet of nature. He is rated as a great poet in Indian Literature. Died on 4 April 1924. His poetries can be decided into lyrics, devotional, patriotic, reformative, ethical, agricultural, elegy and narration of nature. His prose creation include ‘Atma Jeevani’, Shri Nruparaj Singh’, ‘Purana Kabi Fakir Mohan’, Swargriya Kasinath Panda, Ehaki Prothibira Sabda, Sikshit, Asikhsit & Sikshya Bhimanini.’

 Bhima Bhoi
 Chandra Sekhar Behera ( 1873–1936):Chandra Sekhar Behera of Sambalpur was a leading freedom fighter and an active participant in the Non-Cooperation Movement. He consolidated the National freedom movement in Sambalpur region and merged his activities with the Indian National Congress. He was a founding member of the National School of Sambalpur started on lines of Satyabadi Vana-Vidyalaya founded by Gopabandhu Das. As the chairman of Sambalpur Municipality, he received Gandhijee in Sambalpur in 1928. Organised a mass movement against illiteracy and untouchability.He was instrumental in the activities of Utkal Sammilani in formation of the separate statehood for Orissa. Chandra Sekhar breathed his last on 23 January 1936.
 Satya Narayana Bohidar: Known as the pioneer of Sambalpuri language and grammar, Satya Narayan Bohidar was born on 1 August 1913 at Sonepur. His formative and creative years were spent in Sambalpur that produced a good no. of literary translations and biographies. Fighting against all odds, Sri Bohidar was successful in preparing the dictionary and grammar specially in Sambalpuri Language which provided a significant identity to it. Satya Narayan Bohidar died on 31 December 1980, leaving a great legacy behind him to influence the future generations.
 Jadunath Supakar: Born on 10 February 1931 in an artisan's family of Sambalpur town, Padmashree Jadunath Supakar was educated from National Arts School of Shantiniketan. Starting as an artist of portraits, Jadunath earned his name as a great master of handicraft who continued his undying effort for popularity of forgotten traditional weaving. Working for national handloom Board, Jadunath tied his hand in Serriculture. His designs were highly appreciated in London, Paris, New York City and he was engaged in weavers service center, established for the cause of artisans development. Jadunath was also known for his mastery in playing musical instruments.
 Isaac Santra: Known for his service and benevolence par excellence, Isaac Santra was born in 1892 at Sambalpur. Being a Christian, he was persuaded by his family to join a missionary at Bolangir but his interest was different. He graduated as a doctor from Cuttack and decided to dedicate himself in Leprosy Eradication Mission. He established a Lepor home at Hatibari, a village surrounded by dense forests and spent his time in serving the patients. Highly admired by the patients, academic circles in abroad, even by Mahatma Gandhi during later's visit to Sambalpur for his humanitarianism and philanthropy, Isaac Santra was honoured by Govt. of India with "Padmashree" award. He also edited a magazine "Prabhatee", propounding human values and qualities. He died on 29 August 1968.
 Laxmi Narayan Mishra: Eminent freedom fighter, known for his selfless and sincere service to the motherland, Laxmi Narayan Mishra was born in 1906 and had left school as a student to join India's freedom movement. He was imprisoned for seventeen years for his active role in the national struggle for Independence. Jail provided him advantage to be a scholar and Laxmi Narayan had become a real Pandit with his education on religion, culture and political thought. He was an expert in the languages like Odia Language, Sanskrit, Urdu, Bengali, Telugu, Hindi, English and had earned a fame as an extraordinary orator. He was assassinated during a train journey at Jharsuguda.
 Radhashyam Meher. Born on 20-11-1909 at Sambalpur. Died 19-5-1961. He invented the first handloom to weave textiles of ninety inches width. The Sambalpuri Sari is his creativity. He nurtured, tutuored and guided the weaving community to improve their skills . He is known as the father of Sambalpuri -Textiles who herald the era of Baandha Art. He participated in the freedom struggle and jailed during the Quit India movement. He strove, to remove 'un-touchability' and maintain communal harmony amongst all classes and religion. Only his selflessness has consigned him to Oblivion.Ref Samaj dt 19-11-2009; Sambalpuri- Textiles ISBN no- 978-81-906822-0-6.
 Lakshminath Bezbaroa A prominent Assamese littérateur.
 General Sundararajan Padmanabhan He became the 20th Chief of Army Staff of the Indian Army in September 2000. He was born at Trivandrum in the Indian state of Kerala on 5 December 1940 and spent his childhood at Samblapur.Jitendra Haripal, musician
 Aparajita Mohanty''' She is a notable Odia film actress.

See also
Kosli cinema

References

Sambalpur
Sambalpur district